Stephanie Vogt and Yanina Wickmayer were the defending champions, but chose not to participate this year.

Timea Bacsinszky and Kristina Barrois won the tournament, defeating Lucie Hradecká and Barbora Krejčíková in the final, 3–6, 6–4, [10–4].

Seeds

Draw

References 
 Draw

2014 Doubles
BGL Luxembourg Open - Doubles
2014 in Luxembourgian tennis